Pieter George du Plessis  (born 23 July 1947) is a former South African rugby union player.

Playing career
Du Plessis studied at the University of Pretoria and Stellenbosch University and became a Professor of Business Management.

Du Plessis played one test for the Springboks, the 1972 test  match against the touring England team at Ellis Park in Johannesburg.

Test history

See also
List of South Africa national rugby union players – Springbok no. 458

References

1947 births
Living people
South African rugby union players
South Africa international rugby union players
Blue Bulls players
Western Province (rugby union) players
People from Modimolle Local Municipality
University of Pretoria alumni
Stellenbosch University alumni
Rugby union players from Limpopo
Rugby union locks